Justin Rowlatt (born June 1966) is a British journalist, news reporter and television presenter who is currently working as Climate Editor for BBC News. In February 2015 he became the BBC's South Asia Correspondent, based in Delhi. In June 2019 he became the BBC's Chief Environment correspondent.

Education
Justin Rowlatt was born on June 1966 in London and was educated at Hampstead Comprehensive in Cricklewood, and then at Mansfield College, Oxford University, where he studied Philosophy, politics and economics.

Career
Rowlatt has been a correspondent on Newsnight, Channel 4 News and Panorama and has been nominated for Royal Television Society and BAFTA awards for his work.

Early career
One of Rowlatt's first jobs in television was as an assistant producer on current affairs documentary Panorama, where, among many other stories, he worked on a programme which showed how Mercedes, Volkswagen and Volvo car dealers were fixing prices in Britain.

During his time on Channel 4 News, he was a passenger on the train involved in the Hatfield rail crash in 2000, reporting that he "watched the carriages skid and whip around on the gravel besides the track".

Ethical Man
Rowlatt became widely known in Britain when in 2006 he became Newsnights "Ethical Man". On Rowlatt's first day at the programme, Peter Barron, the editor, challenged him and his family to spend a year trying to reduce their impact on the environment. It made him an "accidental green hero", according to The Guardian. In 2003, that paper had commissioned Leo Hickman to spend a year with his young family on a similar project, which resulted in a book entitled Life Stripped Bare: My Year Trying To Live Ethically. Rowlatt, who acknowledges his debt to Hickman (and to Lucy Siegle, author of Green Living in the Urban Jungle), continued in this vein, focusing on environmental impact, especially his carbon footprint (rather than, say, labour rights).

The strand featured Rowlatt reporting on global warming and environment issues across all BBC outlets. Panorama broadcast an Ethical Man special "Go Green or Else". In 2007, Rowlatt presented an hour-long prime-time programme exploring how the United States is engaging with the climate issue for BBC Two's This World, titled "Can Obama Save the Planet?".

Later career
Much of Rowlatt's career has focussed on current affairs and business and economic reporting. He was part of the original reporting team for BBC One's prime time factual programme, The One Show, "reporting on current affairs with flair". He was a relief presenter for BBC Breakfast in 2010 and for BBC Radio 4's PM programme in 2014. During his time as a Newsnight correspondent he caused a minor scandal when the President of Ukraine, Viktor Yanukovych, complained about his dress sense.

As the host of the World Service's occasional series Exchanges on the World Economy, Rowlatt has interviewed some of the most high-profile economists in the world, including Joseph Stiglitz and Nassim Taleb. He was the main presenter on the World Service's flagship business programme, Business Daily. He presented the Radio 4 popular science/economics strand "The Elements", which explored the role of the chemical elements in the world economy, and co-presented two series of the BBC Two personal finance programmes MoneyWatch. He presented the Business section of the Today Programme.

In 2008, Rowlatt became the first television journalist to interview a serving MI6 agent; the intelligence service was seeking to broaden its recruitment. Rowlatt says of his interviewing technique, "It wasn’t like a Paxman interview but I was trying to get under his skin a bit and understand what it was like to do his job." Under the hot camera lights, the agent's false moustache slipped from his lip. His technique evidently annoyed Sir Alan Sugar, the entrepreneur at the centre of The Apprentice. In a 2014 interview, Rowlatt asked him about alleged bullying; Sugar objected, accused him of "gutter journalism", and walked out.

Rowlatt has presented prime time television series including The Trouble with Working Women with Sophie Raworth.  The May 2009 programme caused controversy when at management consultancy Accenture he suggested a female-heavy office must have been full of secretaries. In 2011, he presented The Chinese Are Coming, a pair of documentaries looking at the growing influence of China in Africa and in the Americas.

Also in 2011, he co-presented, with fellow journalist Anita Rani, the two-part documentary travelogue India on Four Wheels, a road trip around India sampling the changes and problems the growing car usage has brought to the country in the last two decades (see Transport in India#Automobiles). The format proved successful, and the pair collaborated on two two-part follow-ups, first China on Four Wheels, which aired in September 2012, (see Transport in China#Motor vehicles) and then Russia on Four Wheels (see Transport in Russia#Roads and highways), which aired in January 2014. Rowlatt and Rani had a "jokey, human interest, quick-in-and-out approach"

Rowlatt reports regularly for From Our Own Correspondent. His dispatches have included reflections on his experiences with the Awa tribe in the Amazon, the time he discussed gay rights while taking a sauna with two homophobic Russians, and what India's space scientists and street children have in common.

Rowlatt was a foreign correspondent, as the BBC's lead reporter for the entire South Asia region. He took up the post in Delhi for two years, starting February 2015. One of his first assignments was the April 2015 Nepal earthquake. That summer he went undercover to Thalsevana, a holiday resort taken over by the Sri Lankan military during the civil war.

Since 2019 he has been chief environment correspondent.

Personal life

Rowlatt is married to writer and former BBC World Service producer Bee Rowlatt and they have four children. The family appears in the year-long filming of Ethical Man, and "Ethical Wife" contributed independently to the series by investigating his oil company holdings. She has written of their relationship and family life in her book Talking About Jane Austen in Baghdad. The couple jointly presented the 2013 documentary Make Me a German.

Rowlatt's paternal great-grandfather, Sir Sidney Rowlatt, was a judge on the King's Bench Division of the High Court of England and Wales. In 1918, he headed the controversial Rowlatt Committee to evaluate terrorism and seditious movements in British India, and drafted the repressive Rowlatt Act, which authorised stricter press censorship and the arrest and indefinite detention of suspects without due process. The passage of the Act in March 1919 ignited protests across the subcontinent and led directly to the Jallianwala Bagh massacre (also known as the Amritsar Massacre); it has been cited as a major factor in stimulating and expanding the Indian independence movement.

As the South Asia correspondent for the BBC, Justin Rowlatt acknowledged his family connection in August 2017. In a BBC article examining the post-1947 India-British relationship, he said he had initially been worried his surname would prove a handicap during his posting in India, but that it had not, as the nation had largely moved on.

His maternal grandfather, Theo Ionides, was born in 1900 and, although eager to participate in World War I, just missed action. He studied engineering at Oxford University, and settled in India to work with Ralli Brothers until it folded in the 1930s. When World War II started, Ionides joined the Royal Navy Volunteer Reserve. He was handpicked by Ian Fleming, author of the James Bond series, to join No. 30 Commando, a special intelligence unit tasked to move ahead of advancing Allied forces. His unit crossed the Channel a few days after D-Day; Ionides was killed by a German bomb that night. His daughter Penelope, Rowlatt's mother, was a young child then, and so grew up without a father.

References

External links
 Justin Rowlatt on Twitter
 EthicalMan on Twitter (no tweets, as of 2021-08-29)
 Newsnight’s "Ethical Man" series
 Newsnight′s "Ethical man" blog

1966 births
Living people
Alumni of Mansfield College, Oxford
Channel 4 people
BBC Radio 4 presenters
BBC newsreaders and journalists
People from London